Life and a Day (romanized: Abad-o Yek Rouz) is a 2016 Iranian drama film written and directed by Saeed Roustaee. The film screened for the first time at the 34th Fajr Film Festival and earned 10 nominations and received 7 awards.

It was released on March 16, 2016, in Iran theatrically.

Premise 
Somayeh (Parinaz Izadyar), the youngest daughter of an indigent family, is getting married and fear is overwhelming each and every member of the family regarding how to overcome their difficulties after she's gone.

Cast 
Payman Maadi as Morteza 
Navid Mohammadzadeh as Mohsen
Parinaz Izadyar as Somayeh
Rima Raminfar as Shahnaz
Shirin Yazdanbakhsh as Mother
Hojjat Hassanpour Sargaroui as Javad
Masomeh Rahmani as Leila
Mehdi Ghorbani as Navid

Reception

Accolades 
Best Screenplay Award at the Dhaka International Film Festival
NETPEC Award and Best Prize at the Australian International Persian Film Festival
Golden Reflection Award at the Geneva International Film Festival
Special Appreciation Award from Gijón International Film Festival
Award for Best Director from American Directors' Viewpoint
Award for Best Actor in American Cinema to Maadi Moody
Crystal Simorgh Award from Italian Cinema
Award for Best Screenplay by French Cinema
( The 34th Fajr Film Festival )
Winner
Crystal Simorgh	Best Actor in a Supporting Role
Navid Mohammadzadeh
Best Actress in a Leading Role
Parinaz Izadyar
Best Director
Saeed Roustaee
Best First Film
Saeid Malekan
First Film Competition - Best Directing
Saeed Roustaee
Best Screenplay
Saeed Roustaee
Audience Award Best Film
Saeid Malekan 
Best Editing
Bahram Dehghan
Best Makeup
Saeid Malekan
For Emkane Mina

Nominee Crystal Simorg
	
Best Actor in a Leading Role
Payman Maadi
Best Actress in a Supporting Role
Shirin Yazdanbakhsh
Best Film
Saeid Malekan
Best Sound Mix
Amin Mirshekari and
Alireza Alavian

Iran Cinema Celebration 2016
Nominee
Jury Prize	
Best sound design
Alireza Alavian

Iran's Film Critics and Writers Association 2016
Winner
Jury Prize	
Best Motion Picture of the Year
Saeed Roustaee
Best Original Screenplay
Saeed Roustaee
Best Performance by an Actor in a Leading Role
Payman Maadi
Best Performance by an Actor in a Supporting Role
Navid Mohammadzadeh
Winner
Special Prize	Best Performance by an Actress in a Leading Role
Parinaz Izadyar
Nominee
Jury Prize	Best Performance by an Actress in a Supporting Role
Shirin Yazdanbakhsh
Best Achievement in Cinematography
Ali Ghazi
Best Achievement in Music Written for Film
Omid Raiesdana
Best Achievement in Film Editing
Bahram Dehghan
Best Achievement in Costume Design
Mohsen Nasrollahi and
Ghazale Motamed
Best Achievement in Sound Mixing
Amin Mirshekari and
Alireza Alavian
Award for Creativity and Talent (Featured by First Filmmakers) /Saeed Roustaee
Saeed Malekan's best technical achievement (for eternal face painting and one day) winner
Diploma of Honor for Best Actress at the 10th Celebration of Critics and Cinema Writers Awarded to Parinaz Izadyar.

References

External links
 

2016 films
2010s Persian-language films
Iranian drama films
Films directed by Saeed Roustayi
Films whose director won the Best Directing Crystal Simorgh
2016 drama films
Films whose writer won the Best Screenplay Crystal Simorgh
Crystal Simorgh for Audience Choice of Best Film winners